Oddbjørn Lie (born 31 August 1987) is a former Norwegian footballer who plays as a defender]. He is the brother of Andreas Lie.

Club career
Lie was born in Ålesund. He made his senior debut for Aalesund on 31 October 2004 against Moss; Aalesund lost 2–1.

Career statistics

References

1987 births
Living people
Sportspeople from Ålesund
Norwegian footballers
Eliteserien players
Association football defenders
Aalesunds FK players